Hfuhruhurr the Word-Bringer or simply, the Word-Bringer is a super-villain who appeared twice as an antagonist for Superman. He was created by Jim Starlin and Dan Jurgens.

Fictional character biography
Little is known about Hfuhruhurr other than he is a leader of an extraterrestrial telepathic cult he calls The Union, consisting of multiple brains linked together in a vast telepathic gestalt. The circumstances that prompted him to create the Union are unknown, but he appears to be convinced that he is doing those in the Union a favour, describing himself once as bringing 'the Word' to the 'unenlightened', arguing that belonging to the Union grants eternal life and great knowledge to its members.

He first appeared in The Adventures of Superman Annual #1. Superman was asked by the President of the United States to investigate the fictional city of Trudeau, South Dakota after its citizens disappeared, effectively turning it into a ghost town. As Superman investigated the city, he approached a manhole, only to find a tentacled slime creature dragging him into the sewers. After briefly battling it, it escaped and Superman soon discovered an extraterrestrial ship underground with technologically advanced equipment. Superman also discovered the brains of the inhabitants that once lived in Trudeau preserved in jars connected to a life-support apparatus. The man responsible, Hfuhruhurr revealed he did this to create The Union, for them to "become one with a higher power" and "remove them from their prisons of the flesh", and converted the bodies into the slime creature he just fought earlier. Superman, angered and sickened by this revelation, charged at the Word-Bringer, as he retaliated with psychic assaults and psionic waves. Hfuhruhurr deemed Superman "too impure" to become part of "the union", but Superman resisted his psionic wave, and punched him onto the apparatus. The creature that Superman earlier fought returned and Superman finally destroyed it with his heat vision. Hfuhruhurr managed to escape into space, while his victims were apparently able to telepathically contact Superman because of the advanced technology which sustains them. They asked Superman to turn off the life-support system which keeps them "alive", and when he refused, they psionically knocked him into a switch turning off the life-support system, "ending" their lives, as Superman laments the fact he couldn't help or save them.

Hfuhruhurr returned during Superman's self-imposed exile from Earth, currently travelling in deep space using a teleporter system. After saving an alien world, he came across another alien world with its entire population deserted and discovers a ship full of disembodied brains from several races. Superman deduces that the one responsible was Hfuhruhurr, and indeed the captain of the ship was the Word-Bringer. Superman was determined to make him pay for the deaths of countless innocents, being particularly disgusted when his foe initially didn't even remember their previous encounter until he actually tried to attack him. Hfuhruhurr attacked him again with his psionic abilities, but when Superman gained the upper hand, Hfuhruhurr used his machinery to create Eon, a manifestation of the psyches of the disembodied brains of "The Union" to battle him. Eon was able to fire intense concussive waves, even knocking Superman into space, but when the Man of Steel was thrown into the ship during the fight, he unintentionally killed one of the brains in the Union when he damaged its containment tank. However, his attempt to save the brain by reassembling a makeshift tank prompted the Union to ask him why he had done such a thing after condemning the Union earlier. As Superman explained that he appreciated the validity of the Union as a concept and simply objected to Hfuhruhurr recruiting 'members' without asking whether they wanted to join, Eon and Hfuhruhurr discovered him once more. However, when Superman confronted the Union with the fact that Eon didn't even care about the loss of one of their own, his words convinced the Union to reject Hfuhruhurr's demands as they realised how distant they had become from the individual lives they had once been. With Superman unable to hand Hfuhruhurr over to any authorities, the Union promised him that they would use Eon to keep Hfuhruhurr in check in future, vowing that they would only recruit the willing minds of those near death to join the Union, Superman promising in return that he would be back if they ruined this chance.

Powers and abilities
Hfuhruhurr has various psionic abilities including telepathy, telekinesis, and can manipulate his psionic energy into waves of concussive force. He also has a superhuman intellect showing advanced scientific knowledge given that he was able to surgically remove brains from different alien races and sustain with a life-support apparatus. He has extensive knowledge of technology far surpassing present-day Earth. He was once able to command the power of his telepathic Union, but after his second confrontation with Superman he lost this power as the Union refused to obey his orders any more.

See also
 Brain in a vat

References

DC Comics aliens
DC Comics extraterrestrial supervillains
DC Comics characters who have mental powers
DC Comics telekinetics 
DC Comics telepaths
Fictional characters with energy-manipulation abilities
Fictional cult leaders
Fictional mass murderers
DC Comics scientists